Spencer Drever (born August 30, 2003) is a Canadian actor who is known for appearing, while he was a teenager, as Gordo Nygaard, Lester Nygaard's nephew in Fargo for which he was awarded a Joey Award. He was a recurring cast member on CBC's Strange Empire and also appeared in Olympus on SyFy. Drever lived in Cloverdale, BC while Fargo was in production

Filmography

References

External link

21st-century Canadian male actors
Canadian male child actors
2003 births
Male actors from British Columbia
Canadian male voice actors
Canadian male television actors
People from Surrey, British Columbia
Canadian male film actors
Living people